Jaga Hatare Pagha is a 2015 Odia romance action family drama film produced by Tarang Cine Productions.  It stars Anubhav Mohanty and Elina Samantray in lead roles. The film is directed by Murali Krishna. It is a remake of Marathi film Lai Bhaari. The Kannada song Life is Awesome from the movie Male was reused in this movie.

Cast

 Anubhav Mohanty
 Elina Samantray
 Mahasweta Ray
 Ajit Das
 Buddhaditya Mohanty
 Jhilik Bhattacharjee

Box office
Jaga Hatare Pagha was released during Dussehra 2015 to positive reviews. In its first day the film grossed , second day it grossed  and third day it collect  at the box office.

References 

2015 films
2010s Odia-language films
Odia remakes of Marathi films
2015 masala films